John Tony Miller (21 September 1950 – 18 February 2016) was an English footballer, described by Jeff Kent as an "exciting right winger who provided pinpoint crosses". He scored 23 goals in 213 league games in a 14-year career in the Football League playing for Ipswich Town, Norwich City, Mansfield Town, and Port Vale. He was promoted out of the Second Division with Norwich City in 1974–75, and won the Third Division with Mansfield Town in 1976–77.

Career
Miller began his career at Ipswich Town. The "Blues" finished 12th in the First Division in 1968–69 under the stewardship of Bobby Robson. They then went on to finish 18th in 1969–70, 19th in 1970–71, and 13th in 1971–72, before launching title challenges that ended with fourth-place finishes in 1972–73 and 1973–74. He scored two goals in 51 league appearances at Portman Road. He then switched to rivals Norwich City for a fee of £47,500, and helped John Bond's "Canaries" to win promotion out of the Second Division in 1974–75. He also appeared at Wembley Stadium in the 1975 League Cup final, where Norwich lost 1–0 to Aston Villa. They then posted a tenth-place finish in the top-flight in 1975–76. Miller scored three goals in 23 league games in his spell at Carrow Road.

Miller then dropped down to the Third Division with Mansfield Town, and helped Peter Morris's "Stags" to win promotion as champions in 1976–77. However they were then relegated straight back down to the third tier in 1977–78. New boss Billy Bingham took the club to an 18th-place finish in 1978–79, before Mick Jones led Mansfield to relegation in 1979–80. He scored 14 goals in 113 league appearances at Field Mill. He joined Port Vale, initially on trial, in September 1980. He scored five goals in 31 appearances in the 1980–81 season, and became a key first team player at Vale Park as manager John McGrath began rebuilding the "Valiants" to challenge for promotion out of the Fourth Division. However, he was prevented from playing in the 1981–82 season due to a knee injury; this injury led to his retirement in March 1982. He later made a comeback with Oakham United, before moving on to Selston and taking up the assistant manager position at Blidworth Welfare. After leaving the game he worked as a taxi driver in Mansfield. He died in a hospital in Mansfield after a battle with cancer on 18 February 2016 at the age of 65.

Career statistics
Source:

Honours
Norwich City
Football League Second Division third-place promotion: 1974–75
League Cup runner-up: 1975

Mansfield Town
Football League Third Division: 1976–77

References

1950 births
2016 deaths
English footballers
Footballers from Suffolk
Sportspeople from Ipswich
Black British sportspeople
Association football wingers
Ipswich Town F.C. players
Norwich City F.C. players
Mansfield Town F.C. players
Port Vale F.C. players
Oakham United F.C. (Nottinghamshire) players
Selston F.C. players
English Football League players
Association football coaches
British taxi drivers
Deaths from cancer in England